Susana Solano (born 1946) is a Spanish sculptor Solano is known for her large-scale sculpture, often made of sheet metal and wire mesh. She lives and works in Barcelona.

Education and early life 
Susana Solano was born in 1946 in Barcelona. She was educated at the Real acadèmia Catalana de bellas artes de San Jorge. Solano began her artistic career as a painter, developing her characteristic sculptural style only in the late 1970s. Solano has stated that memories of her childhood in Barcelona influence her work.

Work 
After Solano's transition from painting to sculpture, her earliest sculptures were made of hanging canvas. In her mature work, Solano's primary medium is sheet iron. Although earlier works included more organic forms, in the mid-1980s Solano's sculptures shifted to a more minimalist and geometric style. At this time, Solano also began including additional materials in her sculptures, including glass and wire mesh.

In addition to her sculptures, Solano has made works on paper throughout her career.

Exhibitions 

Solano's work has been shown extensively throughout Spain, as well as Europe and the United States. Solano's first retrospective was organized by the Museo Nacional Centro de Arte Reina Sofia, in 1993. Her first solo show in New York City was in 1996 at McKee Gallery.

Solano is represented in the United States by Jack Shainman Gallery, in New York City. Her work was first shown there in 2013, with the exhibition A meitat de camí – Halfway there.

Honors and awards 
Solano represented Spain in the 43rd Venice Biennale, in 1988.

The same year, she received Spain's National Award for Plastic Arts.

Collections 
Solano's work is included in public collections including the following:  
 Barcelona Museum of Contemporary Art, Barcelona, Spain 
 Carnegie Museum of Art, Pittsburgh, PA 
 Fine Arts Museums of San Francisco, San Francisco, CA 
 Guggenheim Bilbao, Bilbao, Spain 
 Collezione Gori, Fattoria di Celle, Santomato, Italy
 Museo Nacional Centro de Arte Reina Sofía, Madrid, Spain 
 Museum moderner Kunst Stiftung Ludwig Wien, Vienna, Austria 
 Museum of Modern Art, New York, NY 
 Norwegian Museum of Contemporary Art, Oslo, Norway 
 Stedelijk Museum, Amsterdam, Netherlands

References

External links 
 
 Susana Solano at Jack Shainman Gallery

Living people
1946 births
Spanish women sculptors
Spanish contemporary artists
20th-century sculptors
21st-century sculptors
20th-century Spanish women artists
21st-century Spanish women artists
People from Barcelona
Sculptors from Catalonia
Women artists from Catalonia